Raheem Layne (born July 2, 1999) is an American football safety for the Los Angeles Chargers of the National Football League (NFL).

Early life and education
Layne was born on July 2, 1999, in Deland, Florida. He attended Sebastian River High School and was a three-year player in football. He was named first-team all-area in 2016 and finished his time at Sebastian River with 57 total tackles, two interceptions, and three fumbles forced. He was ranked the 58th-best cornerback nationally by ESPN. A three-star recruit, Layne committed to the University of Indiana.

As a true freshman at Indiana in 2017, Layne appeared in 12 games, including one as a starter, and made 13 tackles while being named the school's "Defensive Newcomer of the Year." The following season, he started seven games, while appearing in all 12, and recorded 39 tackles as well as three pass breakups and a fumble recovery. After starting the first five games of his junior year, Layne was relegated to a backup role in favor of Tiawan Mullen. Despite being a backup, he still managed to post 30 tackles and was named Indiana's special teams player of the year.

Layne missed the entire 2020 season with an injury. He changed his position from cornerback to safety prior to the 2021 season. As a senior that year, he tallied 65 total tackles, one interception, one fumble forced and a pass breakup while starting all 12 matches. He decided to enter the NFL Draft after the season, and finished his college career with 50 career games played, 147 tackles, two forced fumbles and an interception.

Professional career
After going unselected in the 2022 NFL Draft, Layne was signed by the Los Angeles Chargers as an undrafted free agent. He was released at the final roster cuts but was subsequently brought back on the practice squad. He was elevated to the active roster for their game against the Arizona Cardinals, and made his NFL debut in the game, appearing on nine special teams snaps. He was signed to the active roster on December 26, 2022.

References

External links
Los Angeles Chargers bio
Indiana Hoosiers bio

1999 births
Living people
American football cornerbacks
American football safeties
People from DeLand, Florida
Players of American football from Florida
Indiana Hoosiers football players
Los Angeles Chargers players